West Side Stories is the eleventh studio album by the six-time Grammy Award-nominated, one-time Grammy winning composer, keyboardist and pioneer of the smooth jazz genre, Jeff Lorber, released on Verve Forecast in 1994.   After six previous nominations, Lorber won his first Grammy Award on January 28, 2018 for Best Contemporary Instrumental Album for Prototype by his band The Jeff Lorber Fusion.

The collection of eleven songs written mostly by Lorber himself included several featured artists. Among them, Eric Benét, Paulinho da Costa, Paul Jackson, Jr., Michael Landau, Hubert Laws, Kongar-ol Ondar, CeCe Peniston, Kongar-ol Ondar, Paul Pesco (guitarist on the Madonna's The Virgin Tour), or Art Porter, Jr.

The album scored in the U.S. Billboard Top Contemporary Jazz Albums chart at number five.

Track listing

Personnel 
 Jeff Lorber – arrangements (1-11), acoustic piano (1, 2, 5, 6, 9, 10), synthesizers (1-4, 6, 8-11), Hammond B3 organ (1, 4, 10), Minimoog (1, 2, 5, 8), percussion (1, 8, 9), Steinway grand piano (3, 7), electric bass (3), Wurlitzer electric piano (4, 5), melody guitar (4, 8), wah guitar (6)
 Paul Jackson, Jr. – rhythm guitar (1, 2), electric guitar (6, 7)
 Michael Landau – guitar solo (1), rhythm guitar (2), electric guitar (3, 6, 7), nylon guitar (3)
 Marlon McClain – rhythm guitar (4, 8, 11), electric guitar (5), steel guitar (5)
 Paul Pesco – rhythm guitar (4), wah wah guitar (8), steel guitar (9)
 Oliver Leiber – rhythm guitar (10), Mu-tron (10)
 Nate Phillips – electric bass (1, 5, 8, 11)
 Alec Milstein – bass pops, synth bass (3), percussion (3), arrangements (3), electric bass (4, 6, 10)
 John Robinson – drums (1-7, 10), drum loop (6)
 Sergio Gonzales – drums (8, 9, 11)
 Paulinho da Costa – congas (2), shaker (2), castanets (2), percussion (3, 4, 7, 9, 11)
 Gary Meek – soprano saxophone (1, 2, 4, 6)
 Art Porter, Jr. – soprano saxophone (8, 11)
 Hubert Laws – flute (7)
 Eric Benét – lead vocals (5), backing vocals (10)
 Jeff Pescetto – backing vocals (5)
 Shades of Soul – backing vocals (5)
 Kongar-ol Ondar – throat singing (9)
 CeCe Peniston – lead vocals (10)

Production 
 Guy Eckstine – executive producer
 Jeff Lorber – producer, engineer
 Marlon McClain – producer (5)
 Eric Benét – assistant producer (10)
 David Frank – assistant producer (10)
 Jessica Lorber – associate producer, assistant engineer 
 Alan Meyerson – mixing, live drums engineer
 Randi Bach, CPA – album coordination, business management
 Nate Herr – product manager
 Margery Greenspan – art direction
 Lili Picou – design
 Dennis Keeley – photography
 JHL Sound (Pacific Palisades, Los Angeles) – recording and mixing location

Charts

Weekly charts

References 

General

Specific

External links
 
 
 

1994 albums
Jeff Lorber albums